Westway may refer to:

 Westway (London), a main road in London
 Westway (New York) a proposed but unbuilt highway
 Westway (radio series), a BBC World Service soap opera
 Westway (TV series), a British TV series made in 1976
 Westway, Texas
 The Westway, the western extension of Lawrence Avenue, Toronto, Ontario
 Kingsview Village-The Westway, a Toronto, Ontario neighbourhood in Etobicoke

See also
West Way (disambiguation)